The 2012–13 Copa del Rey was the 111th staging of the Copa del Rey (including two seasons where two rival editions were played). The competition began on 29 August 2012 and ended on 17 May 2013 with the final, held at the Santiago Bernabéu in Madrid, in which Atlético Madrid lifted the trophy for the tenth time in their history with a 2–1 victory over hosts Real Madrid in extra time. Barcelona were the defending champions but were eliminated by Real Madrid in the semi-finals. Going into the competition, the winners were assured of a place in the group stage of the 2013–14 UEFA Europa League, but both finalists had already qualified for the 2013–14 UEFA Champions League a few weeks before.

Calendar and format

Notes
Note 1: Match in second leg of Round of 32 between Athletic and Eibar and the involved knockout of Round of 16 were delayed one week later. After the reschedule by UEFA of Europa League match 'Kiryat Shmona v Athletic' to be played on 28 November, the RFEF changed date to 12 December, and the first leg of the involved fixture of Round of 16 was played one week later.
Note 2: Originally was expected to celebrate the second leg of Round of 16 on 18–19 December, and next rounds from 9 to 30 January in mid-week until semi-finals, but according to the note 1 which always it would be one knockout delayed from others and the close celebration of league matchday (celebrated on 20–22 December, prior to Christmas holidays) it was postponed with agreement between clubs and television broadcasters to postpone the second leg of Round of 16 to 8–10 January and move next rounds one week later until 30 January and the celebration of second leg of semi-finals around 27 February 2013.

Qualified teams
The following teams competed in the Copa del Rey 2012–13.

20 teams of 2011–12 La Liga:

Athletic Bilbao
Atlético Madrid
Barcelona
Betis
Espanyol
Getafe
Granada
Levante
Málaga
Mallorca
Osasuna
Racing Santander
Rayo Vallecano
Real Madrid
Real Sociedad
Sevilla
Sporting Gijón
Valencia
Villarreal
Zaragoza

20 teams of 2011–12 Segunda División (Barcelona B and Villarreal B are excluded for being reserve teams):

Alcorcón
Alcoyano
Almería
Celta Vigo
Córdoba
Deportivo La Coruña
Elche
Cartagena
Gimnàstic
Girona
Guadalajara
Hércules
Huesca
Las Palmas
Murcia
Numancia
Recreativo
Sabadell
Valladolid
Xerez

25 teams of 2011–12 Segunda División B. Teams that qualified are the top five teams of each of the 4 groups (excluding reserve teams) and the five with the highest number of points out of the remaining non-reserve teams (*):

Tenerife
Lugo
Albacete
Real Oviedo
La Roda
Mirandés
Ponferradina
Eibar
Amorebieta
UD Logroñés
Atlético Baleares
Orihuela
Huracán Valencia
Badalona
Llagostera
Cádiz
Balompédica Linense
Lucena
Real Jaén
Melilla
San Roque*
L'Hospitalet*
Alavés*
Lleida Esportiu*
Cacereño*

18 teams of 2011–12 Tercera División. Teams that qualified are the champions of each of the 18 groups (or at least the ones with the highest number of points within their group since reserve teams are excluded):

Ourense
Caudal de Mieres
Noja
Laudio
Prat
Catarroja
Fuenlabrada
Real Ávila
Loja
Atlético Sanluqueño
Constància
Marino de Los Cristianos
Yeclano
Arroyo
Peña Sport
SD Logroñés
Ejea
Villarrobledo

First round
The draw for First and Second round was held on 3 August 2012 at 13:00 CEST in La Ciudad del Fútbol, RFEF headquarters, in Las Rozas, Madrid. In this round gained entry 36 Segunda División B and Tercera División teams. The matches were played on 29–30 August 2012.

Balompédica Linense, Real Jaén, Melilla, Huracán Valencia, Lucena, Tenerife and Lleida Esportiu received a bye.

Second round
In this round gained entry all Segunda División teams. The matches were played on 11–12 September 2012.

Cacereño received a bye.

Third round
The draw was held on 14 September 2012 at 13:00 CEST in La Ciudad del Fútbol. The matches were played on 17–18 October 2012.

Alcoyano received a bye.

Final phase
The draw for the Round of 32, Round of 16, Quarter-finals and Semi-finals was held on 18 October 2012 at 12:00 CEST in La Ciudad del Fútbol in Las Rozas, Madrid. In this round, all La Liga teams entered the competition.

Like previous years, Round of 32 pairings was as follows: the seven remaining teams participating in Segunda División B and Tercera División were drawn against the La Liga teams which qualified for European competitions, this is: four teams from Pot 1 (Segunda B) were drawn against four teams from pot 2a (champions) and the three remaining teams in pot 1 were drawn in the same way with the pot 2b teams (Europa League). The five teams in Pot 3 (Segunda División) were drawn against five teams of the thirteen remaining teams of La Liga (Pot 4). The remaining eight teams of La Liga faced each other. Matches involving teams with different league tiers played at home on the first leg the team in lower tier, in the other matches the first team to come out of the draw played at home. This rule was also applied in Round of 16, but not for Quarter-finals and Semi-finals, which order of legs was pure as of the order of draw.

At the time of the draw, the result of the match between Las Palmas and Racing de Santander (which was played later that day) was not known.

Bracket

Round of 32
The first leg matches were played between 30 October and 1 November 2012. The second legs were played between 27 and 29 November 2012, except Athletic Bilbao – Eibar on 12 December 2012.

|}

First leg

Second leg

Round of 16
The first leg matches were played on 11–13 December 2012, except the Eibar – Málaga match, which was played on 18 December 2012. The second leg were played on 8–10 January 2013. The order of legs were changed in knockouts between teams from different levels, the lower league team playing at home in the first leg, as was the case in the knockout FC Barcelona v Córdoba CF.

|}

First leg

Second leg

Quarter-finals
The first leg matches were played on 15–17 January 2013. The second leg matches were played on 23–24 January 2013.

|}

First leg

Second leg

Semi-finals
The first leg matches were played on 30–31 January 2013. The second leg were played on 26–27 February 2013.

|}

First leg

Second leg

Final

The Copa del Rey final was played at Santiago Bernabéu on Friday 17 May 2013.

Top goalscorers

See also
 2012–13 La Liga
 2012–13 Segunda División
 2012–13 Segunda División B
 2012–13 Tercera División

Notes

References

External links

MundoDeportivo.com 
Marca.com 
AS.com 

2012-13
1